Fehim Spaho (13 February 1877 – 14 February 1942) was the Grand Mufti of Yugoslavia and one of the most prominent Bosniak cultural figures of his time. His younger brother was politician Mehmed Spaho.

Spaho worked in varying positions in Sarajevo and Belgrade's local governments between 1901 and 1920. At his own request he was returned to Sarajevo where he was a senior government adviser on faith. He served as the president of the Higher Sharia Court in Sarajevo from 1936 until 1938. He was appointed the Grand Mufti of Yugoslavia in 1938, holding the position until his sudden death four years later.

Grand Mufti
On 20 April 1938 Spaho was among three candidates for the Reis-ul-Ulema, or Grand Mufti, of Yugoslavia. He was appointed on 26 April 1938 and his inauguration ceremony occurred in the Emperor's Mosque on 9 June 1938.

Personal life
Fehim Spaho was born 13 February 1877 in Ottoman-controlled Sarajevo to a coppersmith family. His father, Hasan Spaho was an expert of the Sharia law, and before the Austrian-Hungarian occupation in 1878, he was a judge in Jajce, Sofia, Damascus and Cairo. His mother was Fatima (née Bičakčić). Spaho had two brothers, Mehmed and Mustafa and three sisters, Behija, Aiša and Habiba. Spaho was educated in Sarajevo and attended Sharia Law school.

Fehim Spaho died unexpectedly on 14 February 1942 in war-torn Sarajevo, one day after turning 65.

References

|-

1877 births
1942 deaths
Bosniaks of Bosnia and Herzegovina
Bosnia and Herzegovina imams
People from Bosanska Krupa
20th-century imams
Grand Muftis of Yugoslavia